The Philippines possesses dozens of ruined church sites dating to the Spanish colonial period.

List

See also 
Architecture of the Philippines
 Baroque Churches of the Philippines
 Spanish colonial fortifications in the Philippines
Church architecture

Indigenous Philippine shrines and sacred grounds

History of the Philippines (1565–1898)
 Catholic Church in the Philippines

References 

Churches in the Philippines
Ruins in the Philippines
Church ruins in the Philippines